Robert F. "Bobby" Lewis, M.Ed. (born July 25, 1946) is an American former college basketball player known for his flamboyant dribbling, passing, and play-making. Born in Philadelphia, Pennsylvania, Lewis was a playground and YMCA legend from an early age. His legend grew while at John Bartram High School where he was able to showcase the many moves he adapted from his Hall of Fame mentor, Guy Rodgers.

Early years
Before focusing on basketball, Lewis excelled at table tennis and baseball. In 1960 he was invited to the Youth Table Tennis National Championships in New York, NY after becoming the City of Philadelphia champion. Lewis along with three other youth sports standouts were participants in the TastyKake Baking Company's "Salute to Youth" Campaign that same year. In 1963 he was a member of the City Championship Baseball team along with Major League Baseball Scout Hall of Famer Al Goldis.  The following year, he was selected for the 1st Team All City Basketball Team and was also selected as an Eastern Region High School Basketball All American along with Hall of Famer Lew Alcindor.

College
Lewis rose to prominence at a national level while playing basketball at then Division II South Carolina State College, located in Orangeburg, South Carolina. Under hall of fame coach Ed Martin, Lewis averaged 12 points his freshman year, 11.9 points as a sophomore and 19.1 points as a junior. In 1967, his second year as the team captain, Lewis led his team to the NCAA DII Regional Finals. That same year he was selected as team captain and flag bearer for the United States team in the FIBA Small Player's World Cup Games. The team won the gold medal and was coached by Hall of Famer, John McClendon.

Lewis came back the next year to record an amazing 30.9 points and 11.8 assists per game in his senior year.  He was the #8 leading scorer in the NCAA which earned him UPI Small Colleges 1st Team All American honors.

"THE" 2 Ball Drill Originator

References

1946 births
Living people
African-American basketball players
Basketball players from Philadelphia
Dallas Chaparrals draft picks
Delaware Blue Bombers players
Point guards
South Carolina State Bulldogs basketball players
Wilmington Blue Bombers players
American men's basketball players
21st-century African-American people
20th-century African-American sportspeople